Autocharis is a genus of moths of the family Crambidae.

Species
 Autocharis albiplaga (Hampson, 1913)
 Autocharis arida Mey, 2011
 Autocharis barbieri (Legrand, 1966)
 Autocharis bekilalis (Marion & Viette, 1956)
 Autocharis carnosalis (Saalmüller, 1880)
 Autocharis catalalis (Viette, 1953)
 Autocharis discalis J. C. Shaffer & Munroe, 2007
 Autocharis ecthaemata (Hampson, 1913)
 Autocharis egenula E. Hering, 1901
 Autocharis fessalis (Swinhoe, 1886)
 Autocharis hedyphaes (Turner, 1913)
 Autocharis jacobsalis (Marion & Viette, 1956)
 Autocharis librodalis (Viette, 1958)
 Autocharis linealis J. C. Shaffer & Munroe, 2007
 Autocharis marginata Guillermet in Viette & Guillermet, 1996
 Autocharis miltosoma (Turner, 1937)
 Autocharis mimetica (Lower, 1903)
 Autocharis phortalis (Viette, 1958)
 Autocharis putralis (Viette, 1958)
 Autocharis sarobialis Amsel, 1970
 Autocharis seyrigalis (Marion & Viette, 1956)
 Autocharis sinualis (Hampson, 1899)
 Autocharis vohilavalis (Marion & Viette, 1956)

References

Odontiinae
Crambidae genera